Vlado Matanović (born 29 May 1995) is a Croatian handball player who plays for HC PPD Zagreb and the Croatian national team.

He represented Croatia at the 2020 European Men's Handball Championship.

References

External links

1995 births
Living people
Handball players from Rijeka
Croatian male handball players
Expatriate handball players
Croatian expatriate sportspeople in Slovenia